Mitsubishi Logisnext Americas Inc., previously known as Mitsubishi Caterpillar Forklift America is a material handling equipment manufacturer based in Houston, Texas, United States. It is a subsidiary of Mitsubishi Logisnext.

It is the fourth-largest forklift manufacturer and operates throughout Canada, Mexico, the United States, and Latin America.

The company has manufacturing facilities located in Houston, Texas and Marengo, Illinois.

History 
It was founded on 1 July 1992.

In 2003, the company started implementation of lean manufacturing. 

In April 2019, it acquired Pon Material Handling NA which was operating as Equipment Depot.

In December 2020, the company was renamed as Mitsubishi Logisnext Americas Inc which combined the former businesses, Mitsubishi Caterpillar Forklift America Inc. and UniCarriers Americas Corp.

References

Forklift truck manufacturers
1992 establishments in the United States
American companies established in 1992
Companies based in Houston
Mitsubishi Heavy Industries divisions and subsidiaries